Mahakavi Kalidasa is 1955 Indian Kannada-language film directed by K. R. Seetharama Sastry, in his debut direction. The movie is based on the legends of the poet Kālidāsa. It stars Honnappa Bhagavatar as Kālidāsa, a Sanskrit poet who lived during the 4th and 5th Century CE. It tells the story of how he, an aristocratic young man cursed by his guru with ignorance, goes on to become a great poet. B. Raghavendra Rao, Narasimharaju and B. Saroja Devi (in her film debut) features supporting roles. It was remade in Telugu in 1960 as Mahakavi Kalidasu starring Akkineni Nageswara Rao in Tamil in 1966 as Mahakavi Kalidas starring Sivaji Ganesan. This Kannada film was dubbed into Tamil and released in 1956 as Mahakavi Kalidas. At the 3rd National Film Awards, the film won the award for Best Feature Film in Kannada. The film is seen as a landmark in Kannada cinema.

Cast
 Honnappa Bhagavatar
 B. Raghavendra Rao
 Narasimharaju
 B. Saroja Devi
 Rajasulochana
 B. K. Eshwarappa

Awards
3rd National Film Awards
 National Film Award for Best Feature Film in Kannada - Certificate of Merit

References

1950s Kannada-language films
Films about Kalidasa
1955 films
1955 musical films
Kannada films remade in other languages
1955 directorial debut films
Films directed by K. R. Seetharama Sastry
Indian black-and-white films
Indian musical films